Terence Christopher Brock (February 5, 1970), is an American former professional baseball pitcher, who played in Major League Baseball (MLB) from – for the Atlanta Braves, San Francisco Giants, Philadelphia Phillies, and Baltimore Orioles. He played the  season for the Hiroshima Toyo Carp of Nippon Professional Baseball (NPB).

In 2000 and 2001 Brock was a combined 10–8 with a 4.29 ERA in 82 relief appearances and 5 starts with the Phillies.

While with the Phillies, Brock complained to Phillies GM Ed Wade about Harry Kalas sitting in the back of the plane (the area usually only occupied by players) on road trips.  Wade subsequently banished Kalas from the back of the plane.  However, this situation was quickly rectified, as Kalas was revered by most of the Phillies players who enjoyed having him sit with them.   

In 2002, Brock's only season with the Orioles, he went 2–1 with a 4.70 earned run average in 22 relief appearances. He was released on October 1, 2002.

References

External links

1970 births
Living people
Major League Baseball pitchers
Baseball players from Florida
Atlanta Braves players
San Francisco Giants players
Philadelphia Phillies players
Baltimore Orioles players
Richmond Braves players
Hiroshima Toyo Carp players
American expatriate baseball players in Japan
Nippon Professional Baseball pitchers
Florida State Seminoles baseball players
Lancaster Barnstormers players